Wyoming Highway 92 (WYO 92) is a  Wyoming state highway in the eastern Goshen County that travels from Torrington to the Nebraska state line.

Route description

Highway 92 begins in downtown Torrington at an intersection with U.S. Routes 26 and 85. Highway 92 proceeds southward, concurrent with US 85 Business. In one half-mile Highway 92 intersects mainline US 85 again, where US 85 Business ends and the concurrency with the mainline begins. The routes cross the North Platte River and intersects the eastern terminus of Highway 156 in an area known as South Torrington. Leaving Torrington, the highway intersects the northern end of Highway 154 before splitting off from US 85. US 85 then continues south toward Cheyenne while Highway 92 turns east. Highway 92 travels southeasterly to the community of Huntley, a Census-designated place (CDP), where it intersects the eastern terminus of Highway 161 as the road turns east. Highway 92 zig-zags southeast of Huntley where it intersects the western (northern) terminus of Highway 158 as it heads for the Nebraska state line. At the Nebraska state border near Lyman, Nebraska the roadway continues east as Nebraska Highway 92.

Wyoming Highway 92 follows State Control Number 807 for its entire length

Major intersections

See also

References

External links 

 Wyoming State Routes 000-099
 Wyoming Highway 92
 WYO 92 - WYO 156 to US 26/US 85
 WYO 92 - WYO 154 to WYO 156
 WYO 92 - US 85 to WYO 154
 WYO 92 - WYO 161 to US 85
 WYO 92 - WYO 158 to WYO 161
 WYO 92 - NE 92/Nebraska State Line to WYO 158
 City of Torrington, WY homepage

Transportation in Goshen County, Wyoming
092